3470 or variant, may refer to:

In general
 A.D. 3470, a year in the 4th millennium CE
 3470 BC, a year in the 4th millennium BCE
 3470, a number in the 3000 (number) range

Other uses
 3470 Yaronika, an asteroid in the Asteroid Belt, the 3470th asteroid registered
 Texas Farm to Market Road 3470, a state highway

See also